Manish Rai (born 15 November 1993) is an Indian cricketer representing Bihar. He made his List A debut against Mizoram on 8 October 2018. He is the 83rd player to play for Bihar in the 25 years-old tournament. Earlier this tournament was started as Ranji One Day Trophy in 1993. From 2007 to 2008 tournament, the name was changed to Vijay Hazare Trophy.

References

Living people
1993 births
Cricketers from Patna